Chaetopsis apicalis is a species of ulidiid or picture-winged fly in the genus Chaetopsis of the family Tephritidae.

References

apicalis
Insects described in 1900